The title Duchess of Somerset, held by the wives of the Dukes of Somerset, may refer to:

Anne Seymour, Duchess of Somerset, second wife of Edward Seymour, 1st Duke of Somerset
Frances Seymour, Duchess of Somerset, second wife of William Seymour, 2nd Duke of Somerset
Sarah Seymour, Duchess of Somerset, wife of John Seymour, 4th Duke of Somerset
Elizabeth Seymour, Duchess of Somerset, first wife of Charles Seymour, 6th Duke of Somerset
Charlotte Seymour, Duchess of Somerset, second wife of Charles Seymour, 6th Duke of Somerset
Frances Seymour, Duchess of Somerset (1699–1754), wife of Algernon Seymour, 7th Duke of Somerset
Mary Seymour, Duchess of Somerset, wife of Edward Seymour, 8th Duke of Somerset
Anne Seymour, Duchess of Somerset, wife of Webb Seymour, 10th Duke of Somerset
Charlotte Seymour, Duchess of Somerset (1772–1827), first wife of Edward St Maur, 11th Duke of Somerset
Margaret Seymour, Duchess of Somerset, second wife of Edward St Maur, 11th Duke of Somerset
Georgiana Seymour, Duchess of Somerset, wife of Edward St Maur, 12th Duke of Somerset
Horatia Seymour, Duchess of Somerset, wife of Algernon St Maur, 14th Duke of Somerset
Susan Seymour, Duchess of Somerset, wife of Algernon Seymour, 15th Duke of Somerset
Rowena Seymour, Duchess of Somerset, wife of Edward Seymour, 16th Duke of Somerset
Edith Seymour, Duchess of Somerset, wife of Evelyn Seymour, 17th Duke of Somerset
Jane Seymour, Duchess of Somerset, wife of Percy Seymour, 18th Duke of Somerset
Judith-Rose Seymour, Duchess of Somerset, wife of John Seymour, 19th Duke of Somerset